NVFC may refer to:

 National Volunteer Fire Council, a U.S. association for the volunteer fire and emergency services
 Northern Virginia Royals, an American soccer team
 Northwich Victoria F.C., an English football club
 Northwich Villa F.C., an English football club, now known as Northwich Manchester Villa F.C.
 Nordvest FC, a Danish football club
 Nantlle Vale F.C., a Welsh football club